Hugo von Seeliger (23 September 1849 – 2 December 1924), also known as Hugo Hans Ritter von Seeliger, was a German astronomer, often considered the most important astronomer of his day.

Biography

He was born in Biala, completed high school in Teschen in 1867, and studied at the Universities of Heidelberg and Leipzig. He earned a doctorate in astronomy in 1872 from the latter, studying under Carl Christian Bruhns. He was on the staff of the University of Bonn Observatory until 1877, as an assistant to Friedrich Wilhelm Argelander. In 1874, he directed the German expedition to the Auckland Islands to observe the transit of Venus. In 1881, he became the Director of the Gotha Observatory, and in 1882 became a Professor of Astronomy and Director of the Observatory at the University of Munich, which post he held until his death. His students included Hans Kienle, Ernst Anding, Julius Bauschinger, Paul ten Bruggencate, Gustav Herglotz, Richard Schorr, and especially Karl Schwarzschild, who earned a doctorate under him in 1898, and acknowledged Seeliger's influence in speeches throughout his career.

Seeliger was elected an Associate of the Royal Astronomical Society in 1892, and President of the Astronomische Gesellschaft from 1897 to 1921. He received numerous honours and medals, including knighthood (Ritter), between 1896 and 1917.

His contributions to astronomy include an explanation of the anomalous motion of the perihelion of Mercury (later one of the main tests of general relativity), a theory of nova coming from the collision of a star with a cloud of gas, and his confirmation of James Clerk Maxwell's theories of the composition of the rings of Saturn by studying variations in their albedo. He is also the discoverer of an apparent paradox in Newton's gravitational law, known as Seeliger's Paradox. However his main interest was in the stellar statistics of the Bonner Durchmusterung and Bonn section of the Astronomische Gesellschaft star catalogues, and in the conclusions these led about the structure of the universe. Seeliger's views on the dimensions of our galaxy were consistent with Jacobus Kapteyn's later studies.

Seeliger was an opponent of Albert Einstein's theory of relativity.

He continued his work until his death, on 2 December 1924, aged 75.

The asteroid 892 Seeligeria and the lunar crater Seeliger were named in his honour. The brightening of Saturn's rings at opposition is known as the Seeliger Effect, to acknowledge his pioneering research in this field. Minor planet 251 Sophia is named after his wife, Sophia.

Students

His PhD students were (after Mathematics Genealogy Project, Hugo Hans von Seeliger) :

Julius Bauschinger,		Ludwig-Maximilians-Universität München,	1884
Ernst Anding,	Ludwig-Maximilians-Universität München,	1888	
Richard Schorr,		Ludwig-Maximilians-Universität München,	1889	
Karl Oertel,		Ludwig-Maximilians-Universität München,	1890	
Oscar Hecker,	Ludwig-Maximilians-Universität München,	1891	
Adalbert Bock,		Ludwig-Maximilians-Universität München,	1892	
George Myers,		Ludwig-Maximilians-Universität München,	1896
Karl Schwarzschild,		Ludwig-Maximilians-Universität, München	1897
Lucian Grabowski,		Ludwig-Maximilians-Universität München,	1900	
Gustav Herglotz,		Ludwig-Maximilians-Universität München,	1900
Emil Silbernagel,		Ludwig-Maximilians-Universität München,	1905	
Ernst Zapp,		Ludwig-Maximilians-Universität München,	1907	
Kasimir Jantzen,		Ludwig-Maximilians-Universität München,	1912	
Wilhelm Keil,		Ludwig-Maximilians-Universität München,	1918	
Friedrich Burmeister,		Ludwig-Maximilians-Universität München,	1919	
Gustav Schnauder,		Ludwig-Maximilians-Universität München,	1921	
Walter Sametinger,	Ludwig-Maximilians-Universität München,	1924

References 

 Freddy Litten:Hugo von Seeliger – Kurzbiographie Short biography (in German).
 Obituary: Professor Hugo von Seeliger Scan from "The Observatory", Vol. 48, p. 77 (1925), presented by Smithsonian/NASA ADS Astronomy Abstract Service
 

1849 births
1924 deaths
People from Biała
People from Austrian Silesia
20th-century German astronomers
19th-century German astronomers
Bavarian nobility
Academic staff of the Ludwig Maximilian University of Munich
Recipients of the Pour le Mérite (civil class)
Relativity critics
Foreign associates of the National Academy of Sciences
Members of the Royal Society of Sciences in Uppsala